Khun Ying Jamsai Silpa-archa (born 20 April 1934), née Lekhawat, is the widow of Banharn Silpa-archa, the 21st Prime Minister of Thailand and Thai Nation Party Leader. They have three children: one son, Varawut (married to Suwanna Raiwin), and two daughters, Kanchana and Parichat.

Education and careers 
Jamsai graduated from Phadungsil School in 1944 and graduated from Sanguan Ying School in 1947. She was a founder of Banharn-Jamsai Silpa-archa Foundation to provide educational opportunities to students in Suphanburi province.

Royal decorations 
  Order of the White Elephant Benchamaphon Chang Phueak
  Order of the Crown of Thailand Tritaphon Mongkut Thai
  Order of the Crown of Thailand Prathamaphon Mongkut Thai
  Order of Chula Chom Klao Chatutot Chunlachomklao
  Order of the White Elephant Prathamaphon Chang Phueak
  Order of the Crown of Thailand Maha Wachira Mongkut
   Order of the White Elephant Maha Paramaphon Chang Phueak
   Order of the Direkgunabhorn Pathama Direkkhunaphon
  Order of Chula Chom Klao Tatiya Chunlachomklao

See also 
 Banharn Silpa-archa
 Banharn-Jamsai Tower

References 

1934 births
Living people
Jamsai Silpa-archa
Jamsai Silpa-archa
Jamsai Silpa-archa
Jamsai Silpa-archa